Prisoners of the Lost Universe is a 1983 British fantasy science fiction action film by Terry Marcel and Harry Robertson. Shot in South Africa, three people are transported to a parallel universe when an earthquake occurs just as the scientist is experimenting with his "matter" transmitter. The trio must escape the strange world of Vonya while dealing with a number of villains.

Plot
TV personality Carrie Madison goes to visit crackpot scientist Dr. Hartmann who has invented a teleporter to another dimension. On the way she gets into a car accident with electrician Dan Roebuck, mainly caused by earthquake tremors, which effectively destroys Dan's pickup, and they argue. While demonstrating his machine to Carrie, Hartmann disappears. Dan comes to the house looking for help; while he and Carrie examine the machine they, too, disappear. Carrie finds herself alone in what appears to be a prehistoric world in a parallel universe, called Vonya, where time runs differently. Unable to find the Doctor, Dan and Carrie must figure out a way to get back home. Before they can do that, however, they must deal with tribes of savage cavemen, as well as a brutal warlord named Kleel who has taken a liking to Carrie and seems to be unusually well-supplied with Earth technology...

Cast 

 Richard Hatch as Dan Roebuck
 Kay Lenz as Carrie Madison
 John Saxon as Kleel
 Larry Taylor as Vosk
 Peter O'Farrell as Malachi
 Ray Charleson as The Greenman
 Kenneth Hendel as Dr Hartmann
 Philip Van der Byl as The Manbeast
 Dawn Abraham as Shareen
 Ron Smerczak as Head Trader
 Charles Comyn as Treet
 Ian Steadman as 1st Prisoner
 Bill Flynn as 2nd Prisoner
 Danie Voges as Giant Nabu
 Myles Robertson as Waterbeast

Copyright status 

Prisoners of the Lost Universe is registered as copyright to Samuel Goldwyn Company in the United States Copyright Office database.

References

External links 

Prisoners of the Lost Universe free to download at Archive.org

1983 films
British science fiction television films
Films about parallel universes
Films directed by Terry Marcel
Films shot in South Africa
British science fiction action films
1980s science fiction action films
British exploitation films
1980s English-language films
1980s British films